The Mangaung Regiment (formerly Regiment Bloemspruit) is a reserve infantry regiment of the South African Army.

History

Origin
In 1964, Regiment Bloemspruit with its HQ in Bloemfontein, was established on 1 January as the first Citizen Force Infantry Regiment in the then Orange Free State. The total strength of the Regiment at that stage was 15 members. The then Minister of Defence and later State President, the late Mr J.J. (Jim) Fouché, was actively involved in the establishment of the Regiment.

Colours
The Regimental Colour was presented to the regiment by the then State President Mr J.J. Fouché

On 29 January 1981, the Freedom of the City was conferred on the regiment by the City Council of Bloemfontein, which the unit exercised for the first time on 6 March 1982.
The regiment served in the South African Border War in the 1970s and 1980s.

Amalgamation
On 1 April 1997, Regiment Louw Wepener (Bethlehem), Regiment De Wet (Kroonstad) and Regiment Dan Pienaar (Bloemfontein) were absorbed into Regiment Bloemspruit.

Regiment Bloemspruit post 1994 in the SANDF
Today the Regiment is still active and well with a total strength of more than 500 members. The motto of the Regiment is "Wakker en Trou", meaning Alert and Loyal. A traditional toast, only to be introduced at very special occasions and a traditional way of greeting (only between members of the Regiment) were introduced in 1994.

In 2006, Regiment Bloemspruit was deployed internally at Madimbo in the Limpopo Province as well as in the Eastern Cape with the swine fever outbreak. During April to June of the same year, and January and February 2008 Regiment Bloemspruit participated in ATR/ACR (Army Territorial Reserve to Army Conventional Reserve) Conversion Training with Kimberly Regiment. The regiment presented the penultimate ATR/ACR Conversion Course during January/February 2009.

2009 saw, Bravo Company (B-Coy) under command of Maj Dawid Vos, be attached to 121 SA Infantry Battalion and successfully deployed on a Peace Keeping Mission to the Darfur Region of Sudan from October 2009 to May 2010.

Through Continuation and Formal Training the Regiment continually strives to provide an effective, professional combat ready force to the SA Army Infantry Formation.

With the allocation of Military Skills Development System members with a five-year Reserve Force obligation, the regiment has been continually rejuvenated.

Name change
In August 2019, 52 Reserve Force units had their names changed to reflect the diverse military history of South Africa. Regiment Bloemspruit became the Mangaung Regiment, and have 3 years to design and implement new regimental insignia.

Officers Commanding

Regimental Sergeants Majors
The first Regimental Sergeant Major (RSM) was WO1 A. Horn (1964–1969), followed by WO1 J.F. Fivaz (1969–1984) and WO1 K.J.H. van Zyl (1984-1996). The present RSM (since 1996) is Master Warrant Officer (MWO) C.J. De Bruyn.

Regimental Symbols

Previous Dress Insignia

Current Dress Insignia

References 

Infantry regiments of South Africa
Military units and formations in Bloemfontein
Military units and formations established in 1964